Jacques Van Caelenberghe (2 October 1910 – 16 October 1986) was a Belgian footballer. He played in four matches for the Belgium national football team from 1935 to 1936.

References

External links
 

1910 births
1986 deaths
Belgian footballers
Belgium international footballers
Place of birth missing
Association footballers not categorized by position